Mizengo Kayanza Peter Pinda (born 12 August 1948) is a Tanzanian CCM politician who was Prime Minister of Tanzania from 2008 to 2015. He was a Member of Parliament from 2000 to 2015.

Life and career
Pinda was born in the former northern Rukwa Region which is now Mpanda District of Katavi Region. He holds a degree in law from the University of Dar es Salaam, which he earned in 1974.

He was Assistant Private Secretary to the President from 1982 to 1992 and Clerk to the Cabinet from 1996 to 2000. He was elected as a Member of Parliament for Mpanda East constituency in the 2000 general election, and he also became Deputy Minister in the Prime Minister's Office for Regional Administration and Local Governments in 2000. He was promoted to the rank of Minister in the Prime Minister's Office, while remaining in charge of regional administration and local governments, in the Cabinet named on January 4, 2006.

Pinda was nominated as Prime Minister by President Jakaya Kikwete on February 8, 2008, after the resignation of Edward Lowassa over allegations of corruption. He was confirmed nearly unanimously by the Tanzanian parliament on the same day, with 279 votes in favor, two opposed, and one spoiled vote. Pinda was sworn in as Prime Minister at Chamwino State House in Dodoma on February 9. Kikwete announced the new Cabinet headed by Pinda on February 12; it was notably smaller than the previous Cabinet, with 26 ministers, as opposed to 29 in the previous Cabinet, and 21 deputy ministers, as opposed to 31 in the previous Cabinet.

Amidst criticism and international concern about high levels of corruption in Tanzania, Pinda declared his assets on January 14, 2010. He said that he had "three small houses [and] no shares in any company", and that in his bank accounts he kept less than $20,000. Pinda also stated that his only car was "the one loaned to me as a Member of Parliament".

On November 27, 2014, Pinda was pressured to resign over alleged fraudulent payments worth $120 million (£76m) to an energy firm and top officials.

In 2015, he unsuccessfully sought to be nominated as the CCM's presidential candidate. He announced in July 2015 that he would not seek re-election as MP for Katavi.

He is the current Chancellor of the Open University of Tanzania (OUT) since 2016, appointed by President John Magufuli.

References

1948 births
Living people
People from Rukwa Region
Chama Cha Mapinduzi MPs
Tanzanian MPs 2000–2005
Tanzanian MPs 2005–2010
Tanzanian MPs 2010–2015
Prime Ministers of Tanzania
Pugu Secondary School alumni
Musoma Secondary School alumni
University of Dar es Salaam alumni
Tanzanian Roman Catholics